{{Infobox video game
|title = Popeye 2
|image = Popeye2.jpg
|caption = Japanese cover art
|developer = Copya System<ref>Shangri-La - GDRI :: Game Developer Research Institute</ref>
|publisher = 
|designer = Akihiko Mori
|composer = Akihiko Mori
|released = 
|genre = Platform
|modes = Single-player
|platforms = Game Boy
}}

 is a 1991 2D platform game based on Popeye comic strip created by E.C. Segar, developed by Copya System and published by Sigma Enterprises for the Game Boy handheld. It was later published in North America (1993) and Europe (1994) by Activision.

It is a sequel to Popeye, released exclusively in Japan in 1990.

ReceptionPopeye 2 received average reviews with a score of 59% from Gamerankings and 2.95/5 from Nintendo Power''.

References

External links
 Popeye 2 at GB no Game Seiha Shimasho 
 Popeye 2 at tamahobby.com 

1991 video games
Activision games
Copya Systems games
Game Boy-only games
Platform games
Video games based on Popeye
Sigma games
Side-scrolling video games
Video games scored by Akihiko Mori
Video games developed in Japan
Video game sequels
Game Boy games
Single-player video games